Thokozani Mshengu is a midfielder. He plays for AmaZulu in the South African Premier Soccer League.

References

1985 births
Living people
People from uMngeni Local Municipality
Zulu people
Association football midfielders
AmaZulu F.C. players
South African soccer players
Lamontville Golden Arrows F.C. players
Bloemfontein Celtic F.C. players